Laid-Back Camp, also known as Yuru Camp, is a Japanese manga series written and illustrated by Afro, which was later adapted into an anime series. It follows Rin Shima in her solo camping when she encounters Nadeshiko Kagamihara, whom she later inspires to enjoy camping. The series broadcast 25 episodes over two seasons. The first season aired on AT-X and Tokyo MX from January 4 to March 22, 2018, and consists of 12 episodes. The second season aired on AT-X, Tokyo MX, BS11, Sun TV, and KBS Kyoto from January 7 to April 1, 2021, and consists of 13 episodes. All two seasons are available on Blu-ray and DVD, as well as on streaming services. A third season was confirmed in October 2022.

Series overview

Episode list

Season 1 (2018)

Season 2 (2021)

Notes

References

External links
  
 

Laid-Back Camp